Judgment Night is a 1952 collection of science fiction short stories by American writer C. L. Moore.  It was first published by Gnome Press in 1952 in an edition of 4,000 copies.  The collection contains the stories that Moore selected as the best of her longer work.  The stories all originally appeared in the magazine Astounding SF.

Contents

 "Judgment Night"
 "Paradise Street"
 "Promised Land"
 "The Code"
 "Heir Apparent"

Reception

Reviewer Groff Conklin characterized Judgment Night as "a rich collection indeed -- varied, imagination-stretching, written without cheapness or shallowness." Boucher and McComas praised the title novel as "an opulent and exciting romance . . . written with the colorful warmth which one expects of Miss Moore." In 1970, Algis Budrys characterized the novel as a "masterpiece."

References

Sources

 Electronic edition at Singularity&Co.

1952 short story collections
Science fiction short story collections
Books with cover art by Frank Kelly Freas
Gnome Press books